Alana Filippi (1960 or 1961 – 11 January 2020) was a French singer and songwriter. Her real name was Pascale Filippi, and she also sometimes used the pseudonym Jeanne Ermilova.

Biography
Born in Paris, Filippi moved to Nantes with her parents at a young age. She took drama lessons at the Couturier Jacques Organization. Couturier was also head of the Maison de la Culture Loire Atlantique. When her acting career began, Filippi took the name Alana.

Filippi began her career in theatre. She wrote songs for Calogero, Maurane, Jenifer, Pascal Obispo, Stanislas, Natasha St-Pier, and Grégory Lemarchal.

Discography

Albums
Laissez-les moi (1993)

Singles
Sangs Mêlés (1993)
Laissez Les Moi / Extraits (1993)
	Si Tu M'abandonnes (1993)
	Toutes Ces Photos / Tu T'en Vas (1993)

Awards
Vincent Scotto Award (2005)

References

1960s births
2020 deaths
20th-century French women singers
21st-century French women singers
French women singer-songwriters